Semafor is a theatre in Prague, Czech Republic, established by Jiří Suchý and Ferdinand Havlík in 1959. Suchý has performed there for many years and is the current owner.
The theatre was a starting point for many famous Czech musicians, including Karel Gott and Hana Hegerová.

The name "Semafor" is an acronym for Sedm Malých Forem (Seven Small Forms), referring to forms of theatre.

References

External links

 

Theatres in Prague
1959 establishments in Czechoslovakia
Theatres completed in 1959
20th-century architecture in the Czech Republic